A chronological set from Lou Reed's first stint at RCA Records (1972–1975), Different Times is another anthology of his most famous work. The album collage and design were created by photographer/fine artist Daniel Arsenault. Naomi Taubleb was the art director and graphic designer on the packaging.

Track listing
 "I Can't Stand It"
 "Love Makes You Feel"
 "Lisa Says"
 "Walk on the Wild Side"
 "Perfect Day"
 "Satellite of Love"
 "Vicious"
 "Berlin"
 "Caroline Says I"
 "Sad Song"
 "Caroline Says II"
 "Sweet Jane"
 "Kill Your Sons"
 "Sally Can't Dance"
 "A Gift"
 "She's My Best Friend"
 "Coney Island Baby"

References

Lou Reed compilation albums
1996 compilation albums
RCA Records compilation albums